Holidays in Nazi Germany were primarily centred on important political events, serving as a form of political education and reinforcing propaganda themes. Major national holidays were therefore controlled by Joseph Goebbels at the Reich Propaganda Ministry, and were often accompanied by mass meetings, parades, speeches and radio broadcasts.

Many of the official national holidays in the Third Reich were anniversaries of political events, namely the seizure of power (January 30), the announcement of the Nazi Party program in 1920 (24 February), Hitler's birthday (20 April) and the Beer Hall Putsch (9 November). Others were traditional German holidays. Heroes' Memorial Day was celebrated on 16 March, National Labour Day on 1 May, Mother's Day in May, Summer Solstice in June, Harvest Thanksgiving in Autumn and Winter Solstice in December.

From 1937, Jews were banned from the streets during German public holidays.

See also 

 Public holidays in Germany

References

Society of Nazi Germany
National holidays
Public holidays in Germany
Nazi propaganda